John M. Morris may refer to:

 John McLean Morris (1911–1993), American gynecologist, surgeon and researcher
 John Moses Morris (1837–1873), American minister and author